Hemithorakion (hemi- thorax) was an ancient Greek half-armour that covered the midriff or abdomen area. The inventor is believed to be the Thessalian ruler Jason of Pherae. It was an equipment of the officers, not of common soldiers.  Plutarch records that hemithorakia were worn by Pelopidas and his soldiers during the battle to expel the Spartans from Thebes in 379, a battle in which Pelopidas and his men disguised themselves as women.  In art, it is generally seen on female warriors, which corroborates Plutarch's account.  Instances in art include several vase depictions on Amazons.  An unusual intact terracotta mold from Morgantina, dating from the first half of the fourth century, shows Artemis wearing the hemithorakia while sacrificing a hind.

See also
Linothorax

References	

Ancient Greek military equipment
Ancient Macedonian military equipment
Military history of ancient Thessaly